"Jeanny" is a song by Austrian singer Falco, released in December 1985 as the third single from his third studio album, Falco 3 (1985). It was written and composed by Falco and Rob and Ferdi Bolland, who also produced the song.

It was the third song released as a single out of the album in 1986. Controversial due to its lyrics, it nonetheless topped the charts in numerous European countries. The single re-entered the Austrian Singles Chart in 2008 at number 56 and in 2017 at number 47.

Composition
The song is about a relationship between a man and a woman named Jeanny. At the time when it reached number one, critics said that the song glorifies rape. German TV and radio personality Thomas Gottschalk made various negative remarks and called the song "rubbish". An outcry in German-language markets caused the song to be banned by some radio broadcasters or played with a preceding warning by others.

Falco argued that it is about the musings of a stalker.

The part of the "news flash" in the track is spoken by German newsreader Wilhelm Wieben.

Boycott
Several feminist associations called for a boycott of the song. Some TV and radio stations in West Germany agreed and did not play the song "for ethical reasons", while others just played it on their charts shows. In East Germany, the song was not on air and playing it in dance clubs was prohibited.

There were also demands to prohibit the song in West Germany, but officials denied the application in April 1986. This angered news presenter Dieter Kronzucker, who presented the daily news magazine heute-journal for the West German public TV station ZDF. Following this, further radio stations followed the boycott. In the German federal state of Hesse, the song was aired accompanied by a warning. In the popular music show  cutscenes were aired, but only whilst the song was at the top of the charts.

Charts

Weekly charts

Year-end charts

Certifications

"Coming Home (Jeanny Part II, One Year Later)"

In 1986, Falco recorded a sequel to "Jeanny Part I", titled "Coming Home (Jeanny Part II, One Year Later)", for his fourth studio album, Emotional. The song was released as the album's single, reaching number one in Germany and the top five in Austria, Norway and Switzerland. The single's B-side, "Crime Time", also appears on Emotional.

Charts

"The Spirit Never Dies (Jeanny Final)"

Although marketed as the third part of the Jeanny Trilogy there is no evidence that this song was ever to be planned as the final part. It was originally recorded in 1988 for the Wiener Blut album. There is no hint in the lyrics that this song ever had anything to do with the Jeanny saga.

The album The Spirit Never Dies was released posthumously in 2009 as a compilation of unpublished Falco songs. The title track, "The Spirit Never Dies (Jeanny Final)", was also released as a single and it scored in the top ten in Austria. The track was found by chance after a water-pipe burst in the archives of the recording studio Mörfelden-Walldorf that was used by Falco's producer Gunther Mende in 1987. After the closing of the archives, the tapes were sent to Mende personally, who then had a look at the material, all of which had originally been rejected by Falco's recording label Teldec; this was explained by Horst Bork in an interview mentioning that Falco had tried to use a different style of music at the time that the label did not want to support. After digital remastering of the tape, and inclusion of New Zealand vocalist Rietta Austin, the song was edited and published under the claim that it was the official third part of the Jeanny Trilogy by the album's producers Gunther Mende and Alexander C. De Rouge.

The video for the song is an assembly of cut scenes from earlier Falco music videos along with photos and video clips of Falco's girlfriend Caroline Perron.

Charts

Other trilogy versions
Although the Jeanny theme was planned as a trilogy, only "Jeanny" (Part 1) and "Coming Home" (Part 2) were officially included in the series by Falco. "The Spirit Never Dies (Jeanny Final)" is considered a spurious third installment in the trilogy, which Falco died before completing according to his own plans.

In 1990, the album Data de Groove was published and it contains the song "Bar Minor 7/11 (Jeanny Dry)". The song uses the setting of a bar with Falco talking to a female bartender but one can only hear Falco's verses not the response from the bartender. A background singer repeats "Give it up!" and the song ends with the text "Tell me, who told you your name was Jeanny? ... That, well, that must have been the boss of my record company then." Except for chart positions in Austria, the album was unsuccessful and the Jeanny-themed song was not noticed widely.

Following Falco's death, an Internet company offered a song named "Where Are You Now? (Jeanny Part III)" for download in 2000. The company officials said that the tape with the song was sent to them anonymously; because it was unauthorized, the webpage providing the ability to download the song was taken down shortly later. The music is taken from a period in 1988 when Falco had returned to work with Bolland & Bolland. Soon the theory sprang up that the song was actually a demo tape mixed by Bolland from other studio material in which Falco sung lyrics that had been proposed by Bolland to Falco, but the production of a studio version of the song was abandoned and it was not included on the Falco album for which it had been planned. This explanation was first offered by Falco's fellow musicians Richard Pettauer and Thomas Rabitsch and it was later confirmed by Bolland & Bolland in a television show on 5 February 2007.

Given the three possible successors to Part 1 and Part 2, the timeline can be given in different dimensions:
 Enumeration by recording year
1. "Jeanny" (1985) 
2. "Coming Home" (1986) 
3. "Where Are You Now" (1985/1986) 
4. "The Spirit Never Dies" (1987) 
5. "Bar Minor 7/11" (1990)
 Enumeration by production year
1. "Jeanny" (1985) 
2. "Coming Home" (1986) 
3. "The Spirit Never Dies" (1987+2009) 
4. "Where Are You Now" (1988) 
5. "Bar Minor 7/11" (1990)
 Enumeration by publication
1. "Jeanny" (1985) 
2. "Coming Home" (1986) 
3. "Bar Minor 7/11" (1990) 
4. "Where Are You Now" (2000+2007) 
5. "The Spirit Never Dies" (2009)

Depending on the enumeration each version may be pointed out as the third part in the series of a total of five different songs related to the "Jeanny trilogy".

Music video
In "Part I", the Jeanny character is portrayed by 15-year-old Theresa Guggenberger, a student from the dance school associated with the Theater an der Wien. She was selected from those taking part in a formal job casting prior to the video shoot. Despite the public outcry, she never felt uneasy about her appearance and reprised the role in "Part II". The video for "Part I" contains a number of references to crime scenes both real and fictional. The "news break" portion refers obliquely to Jack Unterweger who was still in jail at the time. The "F" on Falco's trenchcoat in the video refers to the 1931 German film M by Fritz Lang in which a blind man marks the murderer with a chalk sign in the same way. The location in the underground canal is the same as in the 1949 film The Third Man. The main location in the video for "Part I" is the Opernpassage in Vienna. The main location in the video for "Part II" is the Gasometer in Vienna.

References

External links
 "Jeanny" by Falco at Songfacts

1985 singles
1985 songs
1986 singles
Dutch Top 40 number-one singles
Falco (musician) songs
Music videos directed by Russell Mulcahy
Number-one singles in Austria
Number-one singles in Germany
Number-one singles in Norway
Number-one singles in Sweden
Number-one singles in Switzerland
Obscenity controversies in music
Macaronic songs
Reamonn songs
Songs written by Falco (musician)
Songs written by Ferdi Bolland
Songs written by Rob Bolland